Holt is a village in east Dorset, England,  north of Wimborne Minster.  The village had a population of 1,265 in 2001. The electoral ward of the same name had a population of 2,286 at the 2011 census. It also includes Hinton Martell and Horton.

Holt gives its name to Holt Heath, a nearby large heathland common, owned by the National Trust and designated as a national nature reserve.

The village has a football team called Holt United which plays in the Dorset Premier League.

According to the 1901 UK census, Lieutenant-General John Plumptre Carr Glyn KCB, who had fought in the Crimean War, the Anglo-Ashanti War and the Anglo-Zulu War retired to Holt with his wife Belgian born Ellen.

Holt also boasts two popular community halls, Holt Parish Hall (built in 1935) and Holt Village Hall (the former School built in the 1840s).

References

External links

 Census data
 Our Benefice: Holt

Villages in Dorset